Richard Earl Berendzen (born September 6, 1938) is an American scientist, professor, and former president of American University, specializing in astronomy. His resignation in 1990 came following formal charges of making indecent phone calls to households in the Fairfax area over the course of several weeks that year. In 1992, he returned to American University as a full-time physics professor until his retirement in 2006.

Early life
Berendzen was born in Walters, Oklahoma on September 6, 1938. In 1942, Berendzen and his parents, Earl and June Berendzen, moved to Portland, Oregon, where Berendzen developed rheumatic fever and asthma at a young age, which confined him to his room.

In 1945, the family relocated to Dallas, Texas where Earl managed a hardware store. Richard Berendzen remained ill and bedridden for three more years and began spending time stargazing on his lawn.

In 1946, Berendzen began attending school for the first time as a second grader. His mother's mental health began to deteriorate, and "she was wildly unpredictable. Labels like manic, paranoid, delusional, and psychotic came years later. Sometimes she would be furious for no apparent reason; then, in a snap, she could suddenly become incredibly loving, supportive, and fun.” Berendzen began experiencing sexual abuse in his home at this time.

Education

Berendzen attended Southern Methodist University where he pursued a physics degree. He transferred to MIT after his sophomore year and received a Bachelor of Science degree in 1961. Berendzen continued to Harvard as a graduate student where he served as a teaching assistant for both William Liller and Carl Sagan. He graduated in 1967 with a master's degree and a joint PhD in astronomy and education.

Career

Berendzen joined the physics and astronomy faculty at Boston University and became the chair of the astronomy department in 1971. In 1974, he was hired as the Dean of the College of Arts and Sciences at American University in Washington, D.C.  American University appointed him as provost in 1976, and in 1980 he became the university's eleventh president.  During his 10-year tenure as president, Berendzen and his wife Gail averaged eleven Washington social functions every week and the university's endowment tripled in size.

As president, Berendzen secured a $5 million donation from Saudi businessman Adnan Khashoggi toward the Adnan Khashoggi Sports and Convocation Center and named Kashoggi to the university's board of trustees. Khashoggi's donation, and the building's subsequent naming, elicited limited protests from some American University students and former faculty who were concerned about Khashoggi's role in the Iran-Contra Affair. Kashoggi was removed from the board in 1989 after facing charges of racketeering, fraud and obstruction of justice pertaining to his dealings in the Philippines.

In addition to his responsibilities at American University, Berendzen chaired the commission on the Budget and Financial Priorities of the District of Columbia and the American Council on Education's Committee on Foreign Student Policy. He was also an original member of the Committee for the Scientific Investigation of Claims of the Paranormal.

He served on the board of the Planetary Society and the advisory board for the National Center for the Survivors of Child Abuse. He was a consultant to NASA, served on NASA's Exploration Advisory Task Force and Selection Panel for the Teacher-in-Space Program, has served as Director of NASA's Space Grant Consortium for Washington, D.C.., and has testified about space and education before the United States Congress.

Under the auspices of the New York Academy of Sciences and the American Astronomical Society, Berendzen organized and chaired a major international conference, titled "Education in and History of Modern Astronomy." He organized and chaired two other key conferences: "Life Beyond Earth and the Mind of Man" (at Boston University) in 1973 and "Space 2000" (at American University) in 1999. Proceedings from the Boston University was included in Who's Out There?, a 1975 television program narrated by Orson Welles.

Resignation from American University
In March 1990, daycare owner Susan Allen received a phone call from a man claiming to be a gynecologist and inquiring about her sexual habits. Allen reported the call to her husband, a Fairfax County law enforcement officer, and continued to engage with the caller for several weeks while police monitored the communication via call tracing and tape recordings. Allen described the calls as "filthy beyond your most horrible nightmares."

Police traced the calls to American University and Berendzen's private phone line. Among other things, Berendzen asked those he called whether they had sex with children, claimed he kept a 4-year-old sex slave in his basement, and made repeated references to child pornography and purchasing child sex slaves at auction. On April 7, the Board of Trustees confronted Berendzen, who resigned on April 8 and was admitted to Johns Hopkins, where he was treated with several therapies addressing his childhood abuse. On April 10, Berendzen issued a public statement citing "exhaustion" as the reason behind his decision to step down.

Aftermath
Berendzen was charged with two misdemeanor counts of making indecent calls. He pleaded guilty to both and his jail time was suspended on the condition that he continue receiving psychiatric treatment for the next year. Once the case became public, more than two dozen other daycare providers in the Fairfax area reported to police that they had also received obscene calls.

In the summer of 1990, Allen filed a $11 million lawsuit against Berendzen and American University. The case was settled for an undisclosed sum.

In 1992, Berendzen returned to American University as a full-time physics professor and served in that role until he retired in August 2006.

Accomplishments
Berendzen received a honorary doctorate degrees from Seton Hall University and the University of Columbo in 1985, and from the University of Maryland in 1990.

Personal life
Berendzen met his first wife, Barbara Edwards, at Woodrow Wilson High School, and their first daughter, Deborah, was born during Berendzen's first year at SMU.. In 1960, while Berendzen was at MIT, Barbara returned to Dallas with Deborah and the couple divorced. Berendzen married Gail Edgar, who he met at Harvard, in 1964  and the couple had a daughter named Natasha.

References

External links

20th-century American astronomers
20th-century American physicists
Leaders of American University
Boston University faculty
Massachusetts Institute of Technology alumni
Harvard University alumni
Incestual abuse
Child sexual abuse in the United States
People from Walters, Oklahoma
1938 births
Living people
Articles containing video clips